Thrumpton is a village and civil parish in Nottinghamshire, England. At the time of the 2001 census it had a population of 152, increasing to 165 at the 2011 census. The 13th century Church of All Saints is Grade II* listed and was restored in 1871. Many of the gabled brick houses in the village were built between 1700 and 1745 by John Emerton of Thrumpton Hall.

References

External links

Villages in Nottinghamshire
Rushcliffe